For the Australian WW2 Victoria Cross medal awardee see John Hurst Edmondson

John B. Edmondson (born  February 3, 1933; died, December 30, 2016)  was an American professional trumpet player, pianist, music composer, former music teacher, and freelance writer (composer) and arranger. He is a member of ASCAP. He is listed on the international "Who's Who in Music," and also composed Bunker Hill March.

External links
 John Edmondson webpage
 Queenwood/Kjos Publications

Living people
1933 births
American trumpeters
American male trumpeters
21st-century trumpeters
21st-century American male musicians